Pete Strickland (born May 25, 1957) is an American basketball coach and former college basketball player, currently the interim head coach of DeMatha Catholic High School.

Playing career
Strickland attended DeMatha Catholic High School near Washington, D.C., where he played high school basketball for Morgan Wootten. He then attended the University of Pittsburgh where he played for the Pittsburgh Panthers (1975–1979). With the Panthers, Strickland was a three-year starter and two-year captain.

Player-coach
In 1980, Strickland became player-coach of the Neptune Basketball Club based in Cork, Ireland. Strickland had been recruited to play in Ireland by an international scout who saw him play in an alumni game in Pittsburgh. In his first season as player-coach, Strickland's team went 18–0 and won the league title. In 1981, in preparation for the "Neptune International Basketball Tournament" to be held in March in Cork, Strickland recruited a number of his American friends to form a “Maryland All-Stars" team for the tournament, in exchange for round-trip airline tickets to Ireland. The All-Star team was eliminated from the tournament by a Cork-based team on a last-second three-pointer. That an Irish team was able to defeat an American team was credited with helping to increase the popularity of basketball in Ireland.

Coaching career
Strickland coached at the high school level from 1983 through 1988. He then held assistant coaching roles at the college level from 1988 through 1998. In April 1998, he became head coach at Coastal Carolina University, a role he held until March 2005. His overall record in seven seasons with the Chanticleers was 70–127; the team was 42–56 in the Big South Conference.

Strickland was next an assistant coach at North Carolina State University, from 2005 until he was not retained by Mark Gottfried when Sidney Lowe resigned at the end of the Wolfpack's 2010–11 season. Strickland then served as an assistant coach at George Washington University, from 2011 through 2013.

Strickland was named head coach of the Ireland national team in November 2016. In the 2018 FIBA European Championship for Small Countries, Ireland finished in third place, with an overall record of 2–2 during the tournament.

Head coaching record

Sources:

References

Further reading

External links
 (personal website)
Coaching Record at Sports Reference
Interview with Cork's Red FM via YouTube

1957 births
Living people
American men's basketball coaches
American men's basketball players
Basketball coaches from New York (state)
Basketball players from New York (state)
Coastal Carolina Chanticleers men's basketball coaches
Dayton Flyers men's basketball coaches
DeMatha Catholic High School alumni
George Washington Colonials men's basketball coaches
High school basketball coaches in the United States
NC State Wolfpack men's basketball coaches
Old Dominion Monarchs men's basketball coaches
Pittsburgh Panthers men's basketball players
Sportspeople from Newburgh, New York
VMI Keydets basketball coaches